Deepak Balraj Vij is an Indian film director, predominantly within the Hindi film industry. He is the director of Mumbai Godfather, Malik Ek, and Aaya Toofan.

He directed "Aika Dajiba", a Marathi movie released on 13 August 2010.

He is married to Marathi dancer and actress Kishori Shahane.

Filmography

References

External links
 

Year of birth missing (living people)
Living people
Hindi-language film directors
Hindi film producers
20th-century Indian film directors
21st-century Indian film directors